The 2009–10 Big East Conference men's basketball season was the 31st in conference history, and involved its 16 full-time member schools. Syracuse captured the regular season title, its eighth overall, and second outright. However, West Virginia won the 2010 Big East men's basketball tournament, their first.

Preseason 

At Big East media day in October, the conference released their predictions for standings and All-Big East teams.

Predicted Big East results

Preseason All-Big East teams 

Big East Preseason Player of the Year: Luke Harangody, F., Notre Dame 
Big East Preseason Rookie of the Year: Lance Stephenson, G., Cincinnati

Preseason national polls

Watchlists 

On August 19, the Wooden Award preseason watch list included eleven Big East players. The watchlist was composed of 50 players who were not transfers, freshmen or medical redshirts. On October 29, the Naismith College Player of the Year watchlist of 50 players was announced, which included nine Big East names.

Regular season

Season summary & highlights 

 Syracuse head coach Jim Boeheim  became the eighth Division I coach to win 800 games, when the Orange defeated Albany, 75–43, on November 9.
 Notre Dame forward Luke Harangody became the first Fighting Irish player to surpass the 2,000-point and 1,000-rebound mark, during an 80–70 victory over Idaho State on December 2.
 Syracuse won the 2K Sports Coaches vs. Cancer Classic, upsetting #13 California in the semifinals, 95–73, and #6 North Carolina in the finals, 87–71.
 Villanova won the Puerto Rico Tip-Off, defeating Mississippi, 79–67.
 West Virginia won the 76 Classic, defeating Portland, 84–66.
 Connecticut was the runner-up in the NIT Season Tip-Off, losing to #7 Duke, 68–59.
 Pittsburgh was the runner-up in the CBE Classic, losing to #2 Texas, 78–62.
 Marquette was the runner-up in the Old Spice Classic, losing to Florida State, 57–56.
 On January 11, DePaul head coach Jerry Wainwright was fired after a 7–8 start, and a 22-game Big East losing streak, becoming the fourth NCAA Division I coach to leave his position since the season began. Wainwright, who compiled a 59–80 record in five seasons at the school, was replaced on an interim basis by assistant coach Tracy Webster, who remained until a national search concluded following the end of the season.
 On January 18, Connecticut fell out of the AP Poll for the first time since January 28, 2008, after losing consecutive games, to Georgetown, Pittsburgh, and Michigan.
 On January 20, it was announced that Connecticut head coach Jim Calhoun would go on an immediate medical leave of absence, the circumstances of his condition unknown, but unrelated to his previous bouts with cancer and heart issues. UConn athletic director Jeff Hathaway insisted that Calhoun's condition was not career ending, and would not affect the terms of a four-year contract extension, agreed upon in principle in December 2009, but that he did not know when Calhoun would return. Associate head coach George Blaney took over for Calhoun, and lead the Huskies to wins at home against St. John's, then-No. 1 Texas and DePaul, and four losses at Providence, home vs. Marquette, at Louisville, and at Syracuse. Calhoun returned on February 13 for a home loss against Cincinnati, and has since kept quiet on the circumstances of his leave.
 Syracuse head coach Jim Boeheim extended his NCAA Division-I record for most 20-win seasons to 32, when then-no. 4 Syracuse rallied from a 14–0 starting deficit to defeat then-no. 7 Georgetown, 73–56, on January 25.
 On February 27, then-no. 4 Syracuse clinched its eighth Big East regular season title and a no. 1 seed in the Big East tournament by beating then-no. 8 Villanova, 95–77. The game also set the NCAA on-campus basketball attendance record, with 34,616 spectators packing the Carrier Dome. Three days later they won the title outright, with a win against St. John's, 85–66.
 On March 1, Syracuse achieved its first no. 1 ranking in the AP Poll since the 1989–90 season, and its first in the ESPN/USA Today coaches' poll since winning the national championship in 2003.
 On March 6, Louisville upset no. 1 Syracuse 78–68 in the final game at Freedom Hall in front of an arena-record crowd of 20,135.

Midseason watchlists 

On January 4, the Wooden Award midseason watchlist was released, and included six Big East players—more than any other conference. The list was composed of 31 players, reduced from the preseason list of 50. Newcomers included junior forward Wesley Johnson of Syracuse. In addition, six Big East players who were on the preseason list did not appear at midseason: Devin Ebanks, Corey Fisher, Jeremy Hazell, Samardo Samuels, Deonta Vaughn, and Kemba Walker. The list was reduced to a final national ballot of about 20 players in March. On February 24, the Naismith Top 30 was announced, and included newcomers Johnson and South Florida guard Dominique Jones.

Rankings

Statistical leaders 

The regular season team, individual, and attendance figures include all conference and non-conference games played from November 9, 2009 through March 6, 2010.

Team

Individual

Attendance

Postseason

Big East tournament 

For the second straight year, all 16 teams in the conference participated in the Big East tournament. Under this format, the teams finishing 9 through 16 in the regular season standings played first round games, while teams 5 through 8 received a bye to the second round. The top 4 teams during the regular season received a bye to the quarterfinals. The five-round tournament spanned five consecutive days, from Tuesday, March 9, through Saturday, March 13, at Madison Square Garden in New York City.

In the finals, West Virginia held of a last-minute rally by Georgetown to win the title, 60–58. Da'Sean Butler of the first-time champion Mountaineers was named Tournament Most Valuable Player. Butler hit the tournament-winning field goal, and led West Virginia in a series of dramatic games, including a buzzer-beating 3-pointer in the quarterfinals to advance the team over Cincinnati.

NCAA tournament 

The Big East secured eight bids into the NCAA tournament, tying its own Division I record, achieved in both 2006 and 2008. As the Big East tournament champion, West Virginia received an automatic bid into the tournament, while the remaining seven teams all received at-large bids. Syracuse achieved its first #1 seed since 1980, when it lost to #5 seed Iowa in the Sweet Sixteen. These teams combined for 8 wins and eight losses, as two teams reached the Sweet Sixteen, and West Virginia reached the Final Four.

National Invitation tournament 

The Big East received five bids into the National Invitation Tournament, combining for 2 wins and 5 losses. Only two teams, Cincinnati and Connecticut, advanced to the second round, both losing in their respective matchups.

Awards and honors

Conference awards and teams 

The following individuals received postseason honors after having been chosen by the Big East Conference coaches:

Awardees are chosen by a simple ballot, in which coaches are not allowed to vote for their players or themselves (in the case of the Big East Coach of the Year). Coaches voted for Big East Player of the Year and Rookie of the Year from the first team and all-rookie lists, respectively.

Notable members of the first team include Notre Dame senior forward Luke Harangody, who was named to the team for the third-straight year, Villanova senior guard Scottie Reynolds, who was the only player to receive a unanimous selection. Also of note was Syracuse junior forward Wesley Johnson, who was given no all-conference consideration prior to the start of the season, yet helped lead the Orange to a surprising eighth regular season conference title, and received both first team and Big East Player of the Year honors. Notably absent from all lists was preseason first-team pick Deonta Vaughn, a senior guard from Cincinnati, who led the team in assists and finished second in points.

National awards and teams

Players 

Two Big East players, Wesley Johnson of Syracuse and Scottie Reynolds of Villanova were named to the 2010 Consensus All-America First Team, while Luke Harangody of Notre Dame was named to the Second Team. Both Johnson and Reynolds were also named to the AP, USBWA, and NABC First Team All-America selections. Reynolds was also named to the TSN First-Team, while Johnson was named to its Second-Team.

Coaches 

Jim Boeheim, Syracuse:
 Naismith College Coach of the Year
 AP Coach of the Year
 NABC Coach of the Year
 Henry Iba Coach of the Year, from the United States Basketball Writers Association
 The Sporting News National Coach of the Year
 FoxSports.com National Coach of the Year
 Yahoo! Sports National Coach of the Year

See also 

 2009–10 NCAA Division I men's basketball season
 2009–10 Cincinnati Bearcats men's basketball team
 2009–10 Connecticut Huskies men's basketball team
 2009–10 Georgetown Hoyas men's basketball team
 2009–10 Louisville Cardinals men's basketball team
 2009–10 Marquette Golden Eagles men's basketball team
 2009–10 Notre Dame Fighting Irish men's basketball team
 2009–10 Pittsburgh Panthers men's basketball team
 2009–10 Providence Friars men's basketball team
 2009–10 South Florida Bulls men's basketball team
 2009–10 Syracuse Orange men's basketball team
 2009–10 Villanova Wildcats men's basketball team
 2009–10 West Virginia Mountaineers men's basketball team

Notes and references